is one of the six wards of the city of Chiba in Chiba Prefecture, Japan. As of April 2012, the ward has an estimated population of 179,770 and a population density of 5,250 persons per km². The total area is 34.24 km².

Geography
Hanamigawa Ward is located inland in the northernmost part of the city of Chiba. The ward takes its name from the Hanami River, which flows through the ward.

Places
 Amadocho
 Asahigaoka
 Asahigaokacho
 Chigusacho
 Dainichicho
 Hanamigawa
 Hanashimacho
 Hanazono
 Hanazonocho
 Hatamachi
 Kashiwai
 Kashiwaicho
 Kemigawacho
 Kotehashicho
 Kotehashidai
 Makuharicho
 Makuharihongo
 Miharuno
 Minami-Hanazono
 Miyanogidai
 Mizuho
 Nagasakucho
 Nagasakudai
 Naniwacho
 Nishi-Konakadai
 Sakushindai
 Sankakucho
 Satsukigaoka
 Takeishicho
 Uchiyamacho
 Unayacho
 Yokodocho
 Yokododai

Transportation

Railroads
JR East – Sōbu Line
  -  - 
Keisei Electric Railway – Chiba Line
  -  -

Education

Municipal elementary and junior high schools are operated by the Chiba City Board of Education (千葉市教育委員会).

Municipal junior high schools:

 Amado (天戸中学校)
 Asahigaoka (朝日ケ丘中学校)
 Hanamigawa (花見川中学校)
 Hanazono (花園中学校)
 Kotehashi (犢橋中学校)
 Kotehashidai (こてはし台中学校)
 Makuhari (幕張中学校)
 Makuhari Hongo (幕張本郷中学校)
 Midorigaoka (緑が丘中学校)
 Satsukigaoka (さつきが丘中学校)

Former junior high schools

 Hamamigawa No. 1 (花見川第一中学校)
 Hamamigawa No. 2 (花見川第二中学校)

Municipal elementary schools:

 Asahigaoka (朝日ケ丘小学校)
 Hanamigawa (花見川小学校)
 Hanamigawa No. 3 (花見川第三小学校)
 Hanashima (花島小学校)
 Hanazono (花園小学校)
 Hata (畑小学校)
 Kashiwai (柏井小学校)
 Kemigawa (検見川小学校)
 Kotehashi (犢橋小学校)
 Kotehashidai (こてはし台小学校)
 Makuhari (幕張小学校)
 Makuhari Higashi (幕張東小学校)
 Makuhari Minami (幕張南小学校)
 Mizuho (瑞穂小学校)
 Nagasaku (長作小学校)
 Nishikonakadai (西小中台小学校)
 Nishinoya (西の谷小学校)
 Sakushin (作新小学校)
 Satsukigaoka Higashi (さつきが丘東小学校)
 Satsukigaoka Nishi (さつきが丘西小学校)
 Uenodai (上の台小学校)
 Yokodo (横戸小学校)

Former elementary schools:

 Hanamigawa No. 1 (花見川第一小学校)
 Hanamigawa No. 2 (花見川第二小学校)
 Hanamigawa No. 4 (花見川第四小学校)
 Hanamigawa No. 5 (花見川第五小学校)

The Chiba Korean Primary and Junior High School, a North Korea-aligned Korean international school, is located in Hamamigawa-ku.

Noted people from Hanamigawa Ward
Masaki Aiba – singer, actor
Hitori Gekidan - comedian, actor
Matsuko Deluxe - TV personality
Yasuyuki Kataoka - professional baseball player
Akira Narahashi – professional soccer player
Akinori Otsuka - professional baseball player
Fuminori Yokogawa - professional baseball player
Kotofuji Takaya - sumo wrestler

References

Greater Tokyo Area
Wards of Chiba (city)